Valentina Moscatt (born 16 March 1987) is an Italian judoka. She competed at the 2016 Summer Olympics in the women's 48 kg event, in which she was eliminated in the first round by Văn Ngọc Tú.

Moscattis an athlete of the Gruppo Sportivo Fiamme Oro.

References

External links
 
 
 

1987 births
Living people
Italian female judoka
Olympic judoka of Italy
Judoka at the 2016 Summer Olympics
Mediterranean Games silver medalists for Italy
Mediterranean Games medalists in judo
Competitors at the 2013 Mediterranean Games
Judoka at the 2015 European Games
European Games bronze medalists for Italy
European Games medalists in judo
Judoka of Fiamme Oro
21st-century Italian women